Édouard Duhour (1 March 1905 – 21 November 1969) was a French shot putter. He competed at the 1928 Summer Olympics and finished in 11th place. His younger brother Clément competed in the shot put and discus throw at the next Games.

References

1905 births
1969 deaths
French male shot putters
Olympic athletes of France
Athletes (track and field) at the 1928 Summer Olympics